Thunderheist is the only studio album from Canadian electro hop duo of the same name. It was released in North America on March 31, 2009.

Critical reception 
At Metacritic, which assigns a weighted average score out of 100 to reviews from mainstream critics, the album received an average score of 64% based on 11 reviews, indicating "generally favorable reviews".

Track listing

Personnel 
 Isis Salam – vocals
 Grahm Zilla – synths, programming

References

External links 
 

2009 debut albums
Thunderheist albums
Big Dada albums